Red Snow or red snow may refer to:

 Red Snow, a British thermonuclear weapon (1958-1972)
 "Red Snow" (The Twilight Zone), a 1986 television episode which starred George Dzundza and Victoria Tennant
 Red snow, a type of snow algae
 Watermelon snow, reddish snow caused by above type of snow algae
 30 Days of Night: Red Snow, a prequel to the comic 30 Days of Night
 redsn0w, the jailbreak of the second generation version of the iPod Touch by the popular iPhone Dev Team
 Red Snow, a manga novel by Susumu Katsumata
 Red Snow (1952 film), American film starring Guy Madison and Philip Ahn
 Red Snow (2003 film), Chinese film by Zhang Jianya
 Red Snow (2019 film), Canadian film by Marie Clements
 Red Snow (2021 film), American film starring Vernon Wells